The Füchse Duisburg are a German ice hockey team formerly a member of the Deutsche Eishockey Liga and currently plays in the Oberliga.

History
Known in English as the "Duisburg Foxes," the team was founded in 1971.

In 2005, they earned promotion to Germany's top league, the Deutsche Eishockey Liga, where they would play the next four seasons. On March 16, 2009, it was announced that the team would leave the DEL and will play in the Regionalliga NRW for the 2009-10 season.

Names
 Duisburger SC (1971–1987)
 Duisburger SV (1987–1991)
 EV Duisburg (1991–2004)
 Füchse Duisburg (2004–present)

References

Ice hockey teams in Germany
Deutsche Eishockey Liga teams
Sport in Duisburg